Abdullah Nini Al-Shehhi (Arabic:عبد الله نيني الشحي) (born 6 July 1990) is an Emirati footballer who plays for Al-Taawon .

External links

References

Emirati footballers
1990 births
Living people
Emirates Club players
Al Hamriyah Club players
Dibba Al-Hisn Sports Club players
Al-Arabi SC (UAE) players
Al-Taawon (UAE) Club players
Place of birth missing (living people)
UAE First Division League players
UAE Pro League players
Association football defenders